A rumor (or rumour) is a piece of purportedly true information that circulates without substantiating evidence.

Rumor, rumor, or rumour may also refer to:

People
Mariano Rumor (1915-1990), Italian politician

Arts, entertainment, and media

Music

Groups
The Rumour (British band), Graham Parker's backup band
The Rumour (New Zealand band), formed in 1966

Albums
The Rumour (album), a 1988 album by Olivia Newton-John
The Rumor (album), a 2002 album by Before Braille

Songs
 "Rumor" (song), a 2018 song by Lee Brice
 "The Rumour" (song), a 1988 song by Olivia Newton-John

 "Rumor", a song by Kard from the EP Hola Hola, 2017
 "Rumour", a song by Rock Goddess from the album Young and Free, 1987
 "Rumour", a song by Bel Canto from the album Magic Box, 1996

Television
Rumour, a 1970 television film directed by Mike Hodges
 Rumor, a character from The Batman (TV series)
 The Rumor, a character from the comic The Umbrella Academy and The Umbrella Academy (TV series)

Other uses
LG Rumor, a cellular mobile phone
Pheme, the Greek goddess for fame and gossip, also called Rumor

See also
Rumer Godden
Rumer Willis
Rumors (disambiguation)